The Hot Band may refer to:

 The backing band formed by American soul musician Sylvester James in 1973
 The backing band for Emmylou Harris from 1974 to 1991

See also
 Hot band, a phenomenon in molecular vibrational spectroscopy